Ash Shamaliyah (from Arabic الشمالية, 'northern') or Shamal ('north'), or variants, may refer to:

Places
 Northern state, Sudan, or Ash Shamaliyah
 Northern Governorate, Bahrain, or Ash Shamaliyah
 Northern Region, Bahrain
 North Governorate, Lebanon, or Ash Shamal
 Al Shamal, a municipality in Qatar
Madinat ash Shamal
 Shamal District, Afghanistan
 Shamal, Khost Province

Arts and entertainment
 Shamal (album), by Gong, 1976
 Shamal, a music project by Enzo Rao
 Shamall, a music band
 Shamal, a character in Magical Girl Lyrical Nanoha

People
 Marina Shamal (born 1939), a Russian swimmer
 Steve Shamal (born 1996), a French footballer
 Shamal Bhatt, an 18th-century Gujarati narrative poet 
 Shamal George (born 1998), an English footballer

Other uses
 Shamal (wind), a wind in the Middle East
 Maserati Shamal, a car
 , a ship
 Al Shamal Islamic Bank, Sudan
 Al-Shamal SC, a Qatari sports club
 Al-Shamali AC, a Sudanese football club

See also
 
Al-Janubiyah (disambiguation) (southern)
Al Gharbiyah (disambiguation) (western)
Ash Sharqiyah (disambiguation) (eastern)
Al Wusta (disambiguation) (central)
Northern (disambiguation)
Northern Borders Region, Saudi Arabia
North Darfur, Sudan